Ronnie Curran (born 14 December 1940) was a Scottish footballer who played 'junior' for Irvine Meadow before joining Dumbarton, where he was a constant in the half back line for six seasons.

References

1940 births
Scottish footballers
Dumbarton F.C. players
Scottish Football League players
Living people
Association football defenders